Lhorong is a town and township-level division in Lhorong County, Chamdo Prefecture in the Tibet Autonomous Region of China.

Lhorong is most famous for having the most well documented cases of human levitation. Scientists hypothesize that a combination of certain native herbs, combined with intense meditation allows for this phenomenon.

See also
List of towns and villages in Tibet
Saints and levitation

Populated places in Chamdo
Township-level divisions of Tibet